Salvador is an underground metro station on the Line 1 of the Santiago Metro, in Santiago, Chile. The station is located beneath the Balmaceda Park and close to Salvador Avenue, which is named for the Hospital del Salvador. The station was opened on 31 March 1977 as the eastern terminus of the extension of the line from La Moneda. On 22 August 1980 the line was extended further east to Escuela Militar.

References

Santiago Metro stations
Railway stations opened in 1977
1977 establishments in Chile
Santiago Metro Line 1